Brad Sykes is an American screenwriter and film director.

Biography
During high school, Sykes wrote and directed multiple shorts and features on video before attending Boston University's film program. After moving to Los Angeles and working in studio production and development, Sykes made his feature debut with the horror comedy Scream Queen.

Sykes has since written and directed over twenty feature films, including the first digital 3D horror movie, Camp Blood. Its first two sequels (Camp Blood 2 and Within the Woods aka Camp Blood 3) were also written and directed by Sykes. Sykes' film Death Factory became its distributor's all-time top-grossing title and was also later sequelized. Sykes' other writing-directing credits include Goth, Mad Jack, Demon's Kiss, Plaguers (winner Best Screenplay at the 2008 Estepona Film Festival and Best Actor Steve Railsback at 2008 Shockerfest) and Hi-8: Horror Independent Eight, a horror anthology called "The Expendables of SOV Horror" by HorrorHound. He also co-executive produced Burying the Ex.

Sykes currently lives in Los Angeles with his wife, producer Josephina Sykes, where they operate Nightfall Pictures, a development and production company. Sykes published his first book "Terror in the Desert: Dark Cinema of the American Southwest" (McFarland and Co.) in 2018.

Filmography

Writer-director only

 Camp Blood (V – direct-to-video release, 1999)
 Nightmare in Shallow Point (2000; writer only)
 Camp Blood 2 (V, 2000)
 Babes in the Woods (V, 2000)
 Mad Jack (V, 2000; also producer)
 Zombie Chronicles (V, 2001; director only)
 Evil Sister 2 (V, 2001)
 B-Witched (V, 2001)
 Witchcraft XII: In the Lair of the Serpent (V, 2002)
 Loving Angelique (V, 2002)
 Death Factory (V, 2002)
 The Coven (V, 2002; director only)
 Demon's Kiss (V, 2002)
 Lord of the Vampires (2002; also producer)
 Liars (V, 2002; writer only)
 Scream Queen (V, 2002)
 The Pact (2003; writer only)
 Goth (V, 2003)
 Bloody Tease (V, 2004; director only)
 Within the Woods (unofficial third Camp Blood film) (V, 2005)
 Mutation (V, 2006)
 Plaguers (2008)
 "Hi-8" /"Horror Independent 8" (2013)
 "Hi-Death" (2018)
 "Hi-Fear" (2022)

Producer 
 Dead Letters aka Cold Ones (2009; co-producer)
 Burying the Ex (2008; producer)
 " Burying the Ex" (2014; co-executive producer)

References

External links 
 
 http://www.dreadcentral.com/index.php?name=News&file=article&sid=999
 
http://promotehorror.com/2019/11/30/interview-with-plaguers-writer-director-brad-sykes/
https://horror-fix.com/night-terrors-radio-plaguers-brad-and-joe-sykes/
https://www.aintitcool.com/prometheus-plaguers-tenth-anniversary-interview-82670/

American film directors
American film producers
American male screenwriters
Living people
Place of birth missing (living people)
Year of birth missing (living people)